SmartWater is a traceable liquid and forensic asset marking system (taggant) that is applied to items of value to identify thieves and deter theft. The liquid leaves a long-lasting and unique identifier, whose presence is invisible except under an ultraviolet black light.

History
SmartWater, the forensic technology company, was started in the early 1990s by Phil Cleary, a British police officer who served for approximately ten years working in various specialist departments before leaving the force in his 30s to start his own security company. His brother Mike Cleary, a Chartered Chemist and a Fellow of the Royal Society of Chemistry, created SmartWater. Mike was responsible for the development of the technology, whereas Phil created the deterrence and business strategies.

In 1996, SmartWater gained a national profile when the Clearys won the Prince of Wales Award for Innovation of the 'product with most commercial potential' on BBC's Tomorrow's World.

Composition 

SmartWater consists of a liquid containing a code, the presence of which can be seen under ultraviolet light. It is intended to be applied to valuable items, so that if they are stolen and later recovered by police, their original owner can be determined after laboratory testing of a sample. Another application is a sprinkler system that sprays a burglar with the (invisible) fluid, which lasts for months, to generate evidence that connects a suspect to a specific location.

SmartWater comes in three variants, "Index Solutions", "Indsol Tracer" and "SmartWater Instant", which use different techniques to embed such a code. According to Phil Cleary, this allows "millions of chemical signatures" and, in terms of its use as an asset protection system, is an identifier superior to DNA fingerprinting .

The "Index Solutions" variant is a water based solution containing low level additives, which are blended using a binary sequence to ensure uniqueness. The Index Solution is contained within a spray system that is activated by an intruder detection unit, similar to a burglar alarm, and marks the intruder with a spray, which the police locate using a black (UV) light.

The "Indsol Tracer" variant is a polymer emulsion that blends different chemical agents according to a binary code allowing a billion different possibilities, as stated by the company.

The "SmartWater Instant" variant consists mainly of a copolymer of vinyl acetate in isopropyl alcohol. This fluid contains millions of tiny fragments; a unique number called "SIN" ("SmartWater identification number", registered in a national police database together with the owner's details) is encoded into each of those particles.

Uses and effectiveness 

In a speech to security professionals at the NEC in Birmingham in 2006, CEO Phil Cleary stated that 'Property marking initiatives are a waste of time and public money unless they're accompanied by an underlying strategy aimed at creating a sustainable deterrent'. Cleary went on to suggest that criminals would not be deterred by technology unless it had a successful track record of securing convictions in the criminal courts. The SmartWater company developed a crime reduction programme, called 'The SmartWater Strategy'.

In 2008, a research paper into the efficacy of SmartWater was published by a team led by Professor Martin Gill. Gill interviewed criminals and asked whether the presence of SmartWater would deter them from burglary, with 74% saying it would. The paper was later criticised; according to an academic study carried out by the Centre for Operational Police Research, University of Warwick, the research paper was not an academic study, was paid for by the company and had an unclear methodology.

In 2012, SmartWater presented their strategy to officers of the Metropolitan Police, who decided to test SmartWater's concept under controlled conditions. Consequently, a 'proof of concept' trial was initiated in 2013.  SmartWater operated in the London Borough of Brent and, following six months of formal assessment, announced an 85% reduction in household burglary.

The Centre for Operational Police Research in their study said that the 'proof of concept trial' suffered from the same deficiencies as the paper by Professor Martin Gill. They added that the use of SmartWater may not be causal in the reduction in burglaries and could be explained by an increase in police resources in the area.

In 2017, SmartWater became accredited as being compliant with the UK Government's Forensic Science Regulator's Codes of Practice, which became a lawful requirement in April 2021. Evidence adduced at Court that is not so accredited risk being ruled inadmissible.

SmartWater's is accredited with the United Kingdom Accreditation Service. It is solely accredited for the finding and analysis of SmartWater products. It is the company's testing facilites and processes that are accredited, not their products.

Corporate History

During the period from 2016 to 2019, SmartWater started an M&A programme culminating in the acquisition of PID Systems Ltd of Prestwick, Scotland and created the SmartWater Group Limited, comprising SmartWater Technology Limited, PID Systems Ltd, The SmartWater Foundation Ltd and the Centre for Infrastructure and Asset Protection, the Company's intelligence arm which provides crime pattern analysis for the UK police service. 

In 2020 the private equity house Freshstream bought a majority stake in the SmartWater Group Limited, with information filed at Companies House indicating a valuation of approximately £150m.

Founders 

Mike Cleary fully retired when Freshstream joined the Company and Phil Cleary stayed as CEO for a further eighteen months to aid the integration process, until retiring in December 2021.  

Phil Cleary was awarded a Fellowship of the Royal Society of Arts in 2009.

See also 

 Alphadot
 DNA marking
 Invisible ink
 Perfluorocarbon tracer
 SelectaDNA

References

External links 
 
 

Security engineering
Criminal investigation
Law enforcement equipment
Forensic equipment
Security technology
Tracking
British inventions